Paddy Dow (born 16 October 1999) is a professional Australian rules footballer playing for the Carlton Football Club in the Australian Football League (AFL). He was drafted by Carlton with their first selection, and third overall, in the 2017 AFL draft. He made his AFL debut in round 1 of the 2018 season against Richmond at the Melbourne Cricket Ground. He earned an AFL Rising Star award nomination for his performance against Collingwood in round 14, 2018.

Early life and career 
Dow grew up in Swan Hill, Victoria and attended St Mary MacKillop College, Swan Hill
. In 2015, he started attending Geelong Grammar School on a sports scholarship, and he was selected to play for Victoria Country at the AFL Under 16 Championships. He then stated playing for the Bendigo Pioneers in the TAC Cup. In 2017, he pulled off a great performance against Gippsland Power, amassing 35 disposals and kicking 2 goals; however, his season was cut short, as he injured his shoulder in the third quarter, requiring surgery. He finished his 2017 TAC Cup season averaging 18.5 disposals, 12 contested possession and 3 tackles.

AFL career

Carlton (2017–present) 
Carlton selected Dow with their first pick, number three overall, in the 2017 AFL draft. He played a total of 20 games in his debut year, averaging more than 14 disposals per game.

In March 2018, Dow signed a three-year contract extension with Carlton, committing his future to the club until 2022.

Personal life
Dow is currently studying a Bachelor of Business at Deakin University. He is the older brother of  midfielder Thomson Dow.

Statistics 
As of the end of round 23 2021

|- style="background:#EAEAEA"
| scope="row" text-align:center | 2018
| 
| 2 || 20 || 7 || 7 || 136 || 148 || 284 || 40 || 64 || 0.4 || 0.4 || 6.8 || 7.4 || 14.2 || 2 || 3.2
|- 
| scope="row" text-align:center | 2019
| 
| 2 || 19 || 7 || 10 || 138 || 133 || 271 || 40 || 50 || 0.3 || 0.5 || 7.2 || 7 || 14.2 || 2.1 || 2.6
|- style="background:#EAEAEA"
| scope="row" text-align:center | 2020
| 
| 2 || 3 || 1 || 2 || 12 || 15 || 27 || 6 || 3 || 0.3 || 0.6 || 4.0 || 5.0 || 9.0 || 2.0 || 1.0
|- class="sortbottom"
|- 
| scope="row" text-align:center | 2021
| 
| 2 || 17 || 4 || 2 || 95 || 147 || 242 || 28 || 39 || 0.2 || 0.1 || 5.5 || 8.6 || 14.2 || 1.6 || 2.2
|- style="background:#EAEAEA"
! colspan=3| Career
! 40
! 14
! 19
! 278
! 284
! 562
! 83
! 116
! 0.4
! 0.5
! 7.0
! 7.1
! 14.1
! 2.1
! 2.9
|}

References

External links

1999 births
Living people
Carlton Football Club players
Bendigo Pioneers players
Australian rules footballers from Victoria (Australia)
People educated at Geelong Grammar School
People from Swan Hill